The Chloroflexia are a class of bacteria in the phylum Chloroflexota. Chloroflexia are typically filamentous, and can move about through bacterial gliding. It is named after the  order Chloroflexales.

Etymology
The name "Chloroflexi" is a Neolatin plural of "Chloroflexus", which is the name of the first genus described. The noun is a combination of the Greek  chloros (χλωρός) meaning "greenish-yellow" and the Latin flexus (of flecto) meaning "bent" to mean "a green bending". The name is not due to chlorine, an element confirmed as such in 1810 by Sir Humphry Davy and named after its pale green colour.

Taxonomy and molecular signatures

The Chloroflexia class is a group of deep branching photosynthetic bacteria (with the exception of Herpetosiphon and Kallotenue species) that currently consist of three orders: Chloroflexales, Herpetosiphonales, and Kallotenuales. The Herpetosiphonales and Kallotenuales each consist of a single genus within its own family, Herpetosiphonaceae (Herpetosiphon) and Kallotenuaceae (Kallotenue), respectively, whereas the Chloroflexales are more phylogenetically diverse.

Microscopic distinguishing characteristics
Members of the phylum Chloroflexota are monoderms and stain mostly Gram negative, whereas most bacteria species are diderms and stain Gram negative, with the Gram positive exceptions of the Bacillota (low GC Gram positives), Actinomycetota (high GC, Gram positives), and the Deinococcota (Gram positive, diderms with thick peptidoglycan).

Genetic distinguishing characteristics
Comparative genomic analysis has recently refined the taxonomy of the class Chloroflexia, dividing the Chloroflexales into the suborder Chloroflexineae consisting of the families Oscillachloridaceae and Chloroflexaceae, and the suborder Roseiflexineae containing  family Roseiflexaceae. The revised taxonomy was based on the identification of a number of conserved signature indels (CSIs) which serve as highly reliable molecular markers of shared ancestry.

Physiological distinguishing characteristics
Additional support for the division of the Chloroflexales into two suborders is the observed differences in physiological characteristics where each suborder is characterized by distinct carotenoids, quinones, and fatty acid profiles that are consistently absent in the other suborder.

In addition to demarcating taxonomic ranks, CSIs may play a role in the unique characteristics of members within the clade: In particular, a four-amino-acid insert in the protein pyruvate flavodoxin/ferredoxin oxidoreductase, a protein which plays important roles in photosynthetic organisms, has been found exclusively among all members in the genus Chloroflexus, and is thought to play an important functional role.

Additional work has been done using CSIs to demarcate the phylogenetic position of Chloroflexia relative to other photosynthetic groups such as the Cyanobacteria. Chloroflexia shares a number of CSIs with Chlorobiota in the chlorophyll-synthesizing proteins. As the two lineages are not otherwise closely related, the interpretation is that the CSIs are the result of a horizontal gene transfer event between the two. Chloroflexia in turn acquired these proteins by another HGT from a "Clade C" marine cyanobacteria.

Phylogeny

Taxonomy

The currently accepted taxonomy is as follows:

Class Chloroflexia Gupta et al. 2013
 Genus "Dehalobium" Wu et al. 2002
 Genus "Candidatus Lithoflexus" Saghai et al. 2020
 Genus "Candidatus Sarcinithrix" Nierychlo et al. 2019
 Order "Thermobaculales" 
 Family "Thermobaculaceae" 
 Genus "Thermobaculum" Botero et al. 2004
 Order Kallotenuales Cole et al. 2013
F amily Kallotenuaceae Cole et al. 2013
 Genus Kallotenue Cole et al. 2013
 Order Herpetosiphonales Gupta et al. 2013
 Family Herpetosiphonaceae Gupta et al. 2013
 Genus "Candidatus Anthektikosiphon" Ward, Fischer & McGlynn 2020
 Genus Herpetosiphon Holt & Lewin 1968 [Flavilitoribacter García-López et al. 2020]
 Order Chloroflexales Gupta et al. 2013
 Suborder Roseiflexineae Gupta et al. 2013
 Family Roseiflexaceae Gupta et al. 2013 ["Kouleotrichaceae" Mehrshad et al. 2018]
 Genus "Kouleothrix" Kohno et al. 2002
 Genus Heliothrix Pierson et al. 1986
 Genus Roseiflexus Hanada et al. 2002
 Suborder Chloroflexineae Gupta et al. 2013
 Family Chloroflexaceae Gupta et al. 2013
 Genus Candidatus Chloranaerofilum Thiel et al. 2016
 Genus Chloroflexus Pierson & Castenholz 1974 ["Chlorocrinis"]
 Family Oscillochloridaceae Gupta et al. 2013
 Genus Candidatus Chloroploca Gorlenko et al. 2014
 Genus Chloronema ♪ Dubinina & Gorlenko 1975
 Genus Oscillochloris Gorlenko & Pivovarova 1989
 Genus Candidatus Viridilinea Grouzdev et al. 2018

See also
 List of bacteria genera
 List of bacterial orders
Green sulfur bacteria

References

Further reading

External links

External links

Bergey's volume 1
Phototrophic bacteria